is a 1986 platform game based on the film of the same name produced by Konami for the Family Computer. Konami also developed a completely different version for the MSX in Japan. First released on cartridge, it was later re-released in Disk System format in 1988. Although the game was never sold in retail in North America, Nintendo published an arcade port in North America for the VS. System (a coin-operated platform which runs on the same hardware as the NES) under the title Vs. The Goonies and it was also available as a PlayChoice-10 title in the region. A sequel was released titled The Goonies II, which saw a worldwide retail release.

The main theme song for most of the game is a chiptune rendition of Cyndi Lauper's "The Goonies 'R' Good Enough".

Gameplay

Player
In the Famicom version, the player plays as Mikey. Although the main character is unnamed, only referred to as "Player" in the instruction manual. Mikey has to rescue the seven Goonies. In the Famicom version, the player must rescue six Goonie children and a woman. They are all unnamed in the instruction manual too. The children look to be much younger than the main character, but the woman seems to be the same age as the player.

Controls
The player defends himself with a kick, bombs (whose explosions are instantly fatal if he is hit), and a slingshot (found randomly behind doors). The player can find diamonds, restoring his life meter to full if he collects eight. He can also find upgrades that protect him against various hazards such as a firesuit that protects against flames and a set of earmuffs that protect against the music notes cast out by one of the Fratelli brothers.

Stages
In the computer versions, the entire game takes place exclusively in the caverns. The player goes through 25 interconnected and non-linear levels searching for the Goonies.

The Famicom version roughly follows the film, with stages resembling the restaurant, caverns and a pirate ship. The ending also recreates one scene from the film where the Goonies are on a beach watching The Inferno ship sail away. Throughout the journey, the player has to find three keys and one Goonie for each level. He does so by using bombs to blow open the doors concealing them. The player can advance to next level after finding the three keys, but in order to really "finish" the game, he must also free all the Goonies to access the game's final level (The Pirate Ship). Otherwise, the game will restart from the first level.

Enemies
An army of rats patrols the stages frequently. There are three kinds of rats: red, yellow, and white. Red ones need one hit with kick/slingshot, while the yellow ones need two. White rats take one hit like red, but drop a cross granting temporary invincibility. A Fratelli makes an appearance and attempts to attack the player by shooting at him and spreading music notes at him. The Fratellis cannot be killed, even by bombs; they can only be stunned. After a while, they will get up and continue chasing the player (if still on screen). However, if they are stunned while jumping over a pit, they will fall into it.

Related releases 

The theme "The Goonies 'R' Good Enough" by Cyndi Lauper, featured in the beginning of the Famicom title and its sequel, was remixed by Tomoyuki Uchida for Pop n' Music 10, from Konami's Bemani Series. The theme retains its original 8-bit song from the NES with added drum and bass beats.

The three hidden items, Konami Man, Vic Viper (from the Gradius series), and TwinBee, would reappear in Castlevania: Portrait of Ruin, as well as in Castlevania: Order of Ecclesia. The in-game description for these items is "5,000 points", which is what the player receives if he or she catches it before it disappears.

References

External links 
 Vs. The Goonies at the Killer List of Video Games
 The Goonies (Playchoice 10) at the Killer List of Video Games

1986 video games
Arcade video games
The Goonies video games
Famicom Disk System games
Japan-exclusive video games
Konami games
NEC PC-8801 games
Nintendo Entertainment System games
Nintendo Vs. Series games
PlayChoice-10 games
Sharp X1 games
Video games developed in Japan